Venison originally meant the meat of a game animal but now refers primarily to the meat of antlered ungulates such as elk or deer (or antelope in South Africa). Venison can be used to refer to any part of the animal, so long as it is edible, including the internal organs. Venison, much like beef or pork, is categorized into specific cuts, including roast, sirloin, and ribs.

Etymology

The word derives from the Latin venari, meaning "to hunt or pursue". This term entered the English language through Norman French venaison in the 11th century, following the Norman conquest of England and the establishment of Royal Forests.

Definition
Venison originally described meat of any game animal killed by hunting and was applied to any animal from the families Cervidae (true deer), Leporidae (rabbits and hares), Suidae (wild boar) and certain species of the genus Capra (goats and ibex).

In Southern Africa, the word venison refers to the meat of antelope, a Bovidae taxon, as there are no native Cervidae in sub-Saharan Africa.

Qualities
Venison may be eaten as steaks, tenderloin, roasts, sausages, jerky, and minced meat. It has a flavor reminiscent of beef. Cuts of venison tend to have a finer texture and be leaner than comparable cuts of beef. However, like beef, leaner cuts can be tougher as well. Venison burgers are typically so lean as to require the addition of fat in the form of bacon, beef, olive oil, or cheese to achieve parity with hamburger cooking time, texture, and taste. Organ meats (offal) of deer can also be eaten. Traditionally, they are called hombres (originally the Middle English hombres). This is supposedly the origin of the phrase "humble pie", meaning a pie made from the organs of the deer.

When sourced correctly from a healthy deer, venison is a very healthy meat for human consumption. Since deer are inherently wild animals living on grass and wild plants, their meat can be consumed as part of a naturally healthy diet. Venison is higher in moisture and protein, and the protein is more diverse in amino acids and lower in calories, cholesterol, and fat than most cuts of grain-fed beef, pork, or lamb.

Health concerns
Since it is unknown whether chronic wasting disease (CWD), a transmissible spongiform encephalopathy among deer (similar to mad cow disease, scientifically known as bovine spongiform encephalopathy), can pass from deer to humans through the consumption of venison, there have been some fears of dangerous contamination of the food supply from wild deer carrying CWD. The disease has been found among farmed deer in the US and western Canada, but New Zealand has not identified the disease among its herd.

Deer farmers have had tests developed especially for the particular species they raise to obtain better results than those used on cattle. Hunters are advised not to shoot a deer that appears sick or is acting strangely, and they are also advised to take general precautions in examining the meat from deer they have killed.

Religious issues 

Deer is a kosher animal according to Jewish religious law and a halal animal according to Muslim religious law. Deer hunting is prohibited by Orthodox Judaism, as deer must be slaughtered, deveined, and salted according to the principles of kashrut. Venison is occasionally found at upscale kosher restaurants, but it is generally not sold at kosher grocery stores. Deer hunting is allowed in Islam, provided that a Muslim deer hunter says the name of Allah when shooting the deer. However, young deer who cannot run away are considered haram according to Sharia Law .

Availability

Czech Republic 
Venison (as well as other game meats, mainly wild boar) is a part of traditional cuisine and is commonly eaten, not considered a specialty. Dishes such as deer goulash are often on restaurant menus. A variety of venison (roe, red and fallow deer, mouflon) and other game meat is widely available in butcher shops in fresh state, distributed by wholesalers, as well as in big retail chains such as Tesco, at prices similar to beef or pork, around 200 CZK or 8 EUR per kilogram. Despite the popularity and low prices, in recent years the production of venison has surpassed demand, and is therefore often used in production of animal food.

New Zealand
New Zealand has large populations of wild and farmed deer, making venison a relatively common meat. It is widely available in supermarkets.

United Kingdom
Kosher venison is available in the United Kingdom. Unavailable for over a century, beginning in 2019 the venison was imported from an unnamed European country and sold by a kosher meat company. In England, hunting rights were restricted in an effort to preserve property rights. As a result, the possession and sale of venison was tightly regulated under English law, although it is readily available commercially.

United States
In the United States, venison is less common at retail due to the requirement that the animal be first inspected by USDA inspectors. There are very few abattoirs which process deer in North America, and most of this venison is destined for restaurants. Most venison sold through retail in the United States are farmed from New Zealand and Tasmania. It is available through some high-end specialty grocers and some chains which focus on more "natural" meats. Non-retail venison is often obtained through hunting and self-processing, or contracting to small meat processing facilities to do the processing for the hunter, but sale of the finished meat is usually illegal.

The American sandwich chain Arby's gained attention in October 2016 when word leaked through social media that they were about to test a venison sandwich. Arby's later confirmed that they had selected 17 stores in Georgia, Michigan, Minnesota, Pennsylvania, Tennessee, and Wisconsin (all major deer hunting states) to offer a venison sandwich during a four-day test during those states' hunting seasons. Both due to curiosity and heavy demand from hunters, the sandwiches sold out in all markets on the first day of the test.

References

External links

 
 

Venison
Native American cuisine
Vermont cuisine
Cuisine of West Virginia
Deer